Acacia dempsteri is a shrub belonging to the genus Acacia and the subgenus Phyllodineae endemic to south western Australia.

Description
It blooms from September to October and produces yellow flowers. The dark brown firmly chartaceous seed pods that form after flowering have a narrowly oblong shape and are raised over the seeds.

Taxonomy
The species was first formally described by the botanist Ferdinand von Mueller in 1879 as part of the work Fragmenta Phytographiae Australiae. It was reclassified as Racosperma dempsteri in 2003 by Leslie Pedley then transferred back to genus Acacia in 2006. The shrub belongs to the Acacia victoriae group and is easily distinguished from other members by the large inflorescences.

Distribution
It is native to an area in the Goldfields-Esperance region of Western Australia where it is found amongst granite outcrops growing in skeletal sandy or loamy soils.

See also
List of Acacia species

References

dempsteri
Acacias of Western Australia
Taxa named by Ferdinand von Mueller
Plants described in 1879